An address book is a book or database used for storing contact information. The term may also refer to:
Address Book (application), a macOS program
"Address Book", a song by Status Quo on the album Perfect Remedy